2019 in philosophy

Events
Jordan Peterson and Slavoj Zizek debate: Happiness: communism vs capitalism.
Jonathan Lear and Judith Jarvis Thomson are elected to the American Philosophical Society at its spring 2019 meeting.
Donald A. Brown is awarded the Avicenna Prize.
Margaret Boden is awarded the 2019 Barwise Prize.
Ruth Bader Ginsburg wins the 2019 Berggruen Prize.
Ágnes Heller is awarded the 2019 Friedrich Nietzsche Prize.
Agnes Callard, Robert B. Pippin, Henry S. Richardson, and Miriam Solomon are awarded Guggenheim Fellowships in philosophy.
Jerome Kohn and Roger Berkowitz are presented a Hannah Arendt Award.
Martine Nida-Rümelin is awarded the 2019 Jean Nicod Prize.
Rudolf G. Wagner is awarded the Karl Jaspers Prize.
Henk W. de Regt is awarded the Lakatos Award.
Elizabeth S. Anderson receives a "Genius Grant" from the MacArthur Fellows Program.
Thomas Macho is awarded the Sigmund Freud Prize.

Publications

 A Spirit of Trust: A Reading of Hegel’s Phenomenology, Robert Brandom (Harvard University Press, 2019).
 Saving People from the Harm of Death, edited by Espen Gamlund, Carl Tollef Solberg, and foreword by Jeff McMahan (Oxford University Press, 2019).
 Dimensions of Normativity: New Essays on Metaethics and Jurisprudence, edited by David Plunkett, Scott J. Shapiro, and Kevin Toh (Oxford University Press, 2019).
 The Fifth Corner of Four: An Essay on Buddhist Metaphysics and the Catuskoti, Graham Priest (Oxford University Press, 2019).
 The World Philosophy Made:  From Plato to the Digital Age, Scott Soames (Princeton University Press, 2019).
 Measuring Social Welfare:  An Introduction, Matthew Adler (Oxford University Press, 2019).
 The Cosmopolitan Tradition:  A Noble but Flawed Ideal, Martha Nussbaum (Harvard University Press, 2019).
 How Change Happens, Cass Sunstein (MIT Press, 2019).

Deaths

January 12 – Takeshi Umehara, Japanese philosopher (born 1925)
January 18 – Gary Gutting, American philosopher (born 1942)
January 18 – Etienne Vermeersch, Belgian philosopher (born 1934)
July 7 – James D. Wallace, philosopher at University of Illinois Urbana-Champaign, father of author David Foster Wallace.
July 11 – John Gardner, legal philosopher at Oxford University.
July 16 – Daniel Callahan, American philosopher, bioethicist, and co-founder of The Hastings Center (born 1930).
July 19 – Ágnes Heller, Hungarian philosopher who was part of the Budapest School.
July 26 – Bryan Magee, British popularizer of philosophy (born 1930).
9 August – Barry Stroud, Canadian philosopher known for his work on philosophical skepticism, David Hume, and Ludwig Wittgenstein.
18 September – Richard Watson, American philosopher known for his work on Descartes.
20 September – Myles Burnyeat, English philosopher specializing in ancient philosophy.
14 October – Karola Stotz, German philosopher specializing in philosophy of science.
17 October – Horace Romano Harré, British philosophy known for his work in philosophy of science and philosophy of psychology.
21 October – Michael Detlefsen, American philosopher who specialized in logic and philosophy of mathematics, spending most of his career at the University of Notre Dame.
21 November – James Griffin, American-born philosopher who spent much of his career at Oxford, specializing in ethics and value theory.
27 November – Jaegwon Kim, American philosopher who specialized in philosophy of mind and metaphysics.
2 December – Kenneth Allen Taylor, American philosopher who specialized in philosophy of language and philosophy of mind.
23 December – Brian McGuinness, British philosopher.

References

Philosophy
Philosophy by year
21st-century philosophy